Ismail bin Kassim (born 2 October 1959) is a Malaysian politician and the member of the Perlis State Legislative Assembly for  until November 2022. From 2008 to 2013 he was a member of the federal parliament for the  constituency in Perlis. He is also the younger brother of the former Chief Minister of Perlis, Shahidan Kassim. Presently Ismail is a member of the United Malays National Organisation or Pertubuhan Kebangsaan Melayu Bersatu (UMNO), a component of Barisan Nasional (BN) coalition.

Early in his political career, Ismail had joined United Malays National Organization (UMNO) of Barisan Nasional (BN) at the age of 28 and had served as the head of UMNO's youth wing in Perlis. He contested the federal seat of Arau by-election, 1998 but was defeated by Hashim Jasin of Pan-Malaysian Islamic Party (PAS). His candidacy in 1998 was marred by accusations of cronyism arising from his brother's position as Menteri Besar of Perlis. At the time, UMNO was bleeding support due to allegations by supporters of UMNO leadership contender Anwar Ibrahim of cronyism and nepotism within the party. Selecting the brother of the state's Chief Minister as UMNO's candidate did little to neutralise the allegations. Ismail's defeat was the first time that UMNO had lost a parliamentary seat in Perlis to PAS.

Ismail was later appointed to the Dewan Negara (Senate), before re-contesting and winning Arau ten years later, in the 2008 general election, defeating opponent from PAS by a 300-vote margin. His predecessor, Syed Razlan Syed Putra, had held the seat with a majority of 3,243.

For the 2013 election, Ismail switched seats with his brother, Shahidan: Ismail moved to the Perlis State Assembly, winning the seat of Tambun Tulang, which his brother had held since 1995, while Shahidan contested and won the federal seat of Arau. In the 2018 election he was nominated as a candidate for Menteri Besar by Perlis BN after retaining his seat but when the plan did not go through, he decided to quit UMNO to become first Perlis independent state assemblyman. He later applied to join Kedah People's Justice Party (PKR) instead but the application was never reported to be approved. Ismail finally announced he had joined Malaysian United Indigenous Party (BERSATU) in August 2019, but reverted to UMNO on 16 May 2020 after his application to join UMNO approved.

Election results

Honours
  :
  Knight Commander of the Order of the Crown of Perlis (DPMP) – Dato' (2007)

References

1959 births
Living people
People from Perlis
Malaysian people of Malay descent
Malaysian Muslims
Malaysian United Indigenous Party politicians
United Malays National Organisation politicians
Independent politicians in Malaysia
Members of the Dewan Rakyat
Members of the Dewan Negara
Members of the Perlis State Legislative Assembly
21st-century Malaysian politicians